A regional language is a language spoken in a region of a sovereign state, whether it be a small area, a federated state or province or some wider area.

Internationally, for the purposes of the European Charter for Regional or Minority Languages, "regional or minority languages" means languages that are:
traditionally used within a given territory of a State by nationals of that State who form a group numerically smaller than the rest of the State's population and
different from the official language(s) of that State

Recognition of regional or minority languages must not be confused with recognition as an official language.

Influence of number of speakers
There are many cases when a regional language can claim greater numbers of speakers than certain languages which happen to be official languages of sovereign states. For example, Catalan (a regional language of Spain, Italy and France, albeit the national language of Andorra) has more speakers than Finnish or Danish.  A similar situation exists in China, where Wu, spoken in southern Jiangsu, northern, and the general area of Shanghai Zhejiang by more than 90 million speakers, is spoken natively by more speakers than French; Yue Chinese, a Chinese regional variety spoken in Guangdong, Hong Kong and nearby areas in China with more than 60 million local and overseas speakers (North America, parts of Malaysia), outnumbers Italian in number of speakers. Dialects of the Min dialect group have over 70 million speakers, mainly in Fujian and in nearby Taiwan, but also in the Southeast Asian countries of Malaysia and Singapore.

Relationship with official languages
In some cases, a regional language may be closely related to the state's main language or official language. For example:

The Frisian languages spoken in the Netherlands and Germany, which belong to the Germanic family.
The Gutnish language, a regional language spoken in Gotland and related to the Swedish language.
Kurdish in Kurdistan, which is an autonomous region in northern Iraq, Northwestern Iran and southeastern Turkey.
Assyrian Neo-Aramaic in northern Iraq, northeastern Syria, southeastern Turkey and northwestern Iran.
The several hundred Sinitic languages are nearly always replaced by Standard Chinese (based on the Beijing dialect) in writing.
Wu, in Shanghai, southern Jiangsu, Zhejiang and eastern Jiangxi.
Yue Chinese, in Guangdong, parts of Guangxi, Hainan, Hong Kong and Macau, Cantonese is the regional standard variety for Yue-speaking areas
Hakka, in parts of Guangdong, Jiangxi, Fujian, and Taiwan
Min, in Fujian, Taiwan, eastern Guangdong and Hainan.
Xiang, in Hunan.
Gan, in Jiangxi.
Kashubian, a regional language of Poland.
Limburgish, a regional language in Germany, the Netherlands and Belgium, has around one million speakers and is closely related to Luxembourgish, South Guelderish and Ripuarian.
Low German (also referred to as Low Saxon), an officially recognized regional language in Germany and the Netherlands, the direct descendant of Old Saxon. Sometimes (e.g. by nds and nds-nl Wikipedia) considered two languages divided by today’s Netherlands–German border on account of Dutch influences in the west and German influences in the east; closely related to Frisian, more distantly to German.
Scots, a regional language of Scotland and Northern Ireland (both part of the United Kingdom, and where it is known as Ulster Scots in the latter location), belongs to the same family of West Germanic languages as English.
 Neapolitan, Sicilian and Venetian, regional languages spoken in Italy which also belong to the same family of standard Italian (Italo-Dalmatian).
 Regional languages of Spain and Portugal:
Aranese, Catalan, and Galician are each, in the regions where they are the autochthonous language, co-official in status with Castilian (Spanish) which is official everywhere in the Kingdom of Spain.
Asturian and Leonese are recognized (but unofficial) in Asturias and Castile and León (Spain), while Mirandese is co-official with Portuguese in Miranda do Douro (Portugal). These Romance languages are classified under the term Astur-Leonese languages. Astur-Leonese is closely related to both Castilian and Galician, which itself is most closely related to Portuguese. Catalan is an Occitano-Romance language.
Occitan, most widely spoken across the Pyrenees in France and Catalonia, together with Catalan, forms a subgroup of Romance languages linguistically intermediate between French and the Ibero-Romance languages of Spain and Portugal. Aranese is a subdialect of Gascon
Tibetic languages
Amdo tibetan language have regional official status in amdo or Qinghai.
Standard Tibetan is currently based on Lhasa Tibetan.
Võro and Seto, regional languages of Estonia, are either dialects of Estonian or separate Finnic languages as Estonian.
Walloon, a regional language of France and Belgium, belongs to the same family of Oïl languages as French.
Hindi and English are the official languages of India's Central Government.
 Indian regional languages are: Assamese, Bengali, Bhojpuri, Bodo, Dogri, Gujarati, Kannada, Kashmiri, Konkani, Maithili, Malayalam, Manipuri, Marathi, Nepali, Odia, Punjabi, Sanskrit, Santali, Sindhi, Tamil, Telugu, Tulu, Urdu
Sylheti, a regional language of Sylhet Division of Bangladesh and the Barak Valley of Assam, India, is often considered as a dialect of Bengali though is seen sometimes as a separate language

In other cases, a regional language may be very different from the state's main language or official language. For example:

Basque, a regional language spoken in Spain and France (Basque Country).
Breton, a regional Celtic language spoken in France (Brittany).
Cherokee is an Iroquoian language, and one of the many Native American languages spoken in the U.S. State of Oklahoma.
Cornish, a regional Celtic language in the United Kingdom (Cornwall).
Corsican, a regional language in France (Corsica) closely related to Tuscan-derived Italian.
Gagauz, a regional Turkic language spoken in Moldova.
Livonian, a regional language of the Finnic family spoken in Latvia.
Resian, a dialect of Slovene spoken in Italy (Resia valley).
Sardinian, a regional Romance language spoken in Italy (Sardinia).
Scottish Gaelic, a regional Celtic language spoken in the United Kingdom (Scotland).
Sorbian, a regional Slavic language of Germany.
Welsh, a regional Celtic language spoken in the United Kingdom (Wales).

Official languages as regional languages
An official language of a country may also be spoken as a regional language in a region of a neighbouring country. For example:
Afrikaans, an official language of South Africa, is a regional language of Namibia.
Arabic, official in Zanzibar, a region of Tanzania.
Bengali is the official language of Bangladesh, and is the regional language of West Bengal in India.
Cantonese, one of the official standard varieties in Hong Kong and Macau (both special administrative regions of the People's Republic of China), is used as a regional language of the province of Guangdong, People's Republic of China.
Catalan, the official language of Andorra, is a regional language in Spain (Catalonia, Balearic Islands and Valencian Community), France (Pyrénées Orientales) and Italy (Alghero, Sardinia).
German, an official language of Austria, Belgium, Germany, Liechtenstein, Luxembourg and Switzerland, is a regional language in Italy (South Tyrol), Poland (Silesia), France (Alsace and Lorraine), Denmark (Southern) and Namibia.
Hakka, one of the national languages of Taiwan, is spoken as a regional language in the provinces of Guangdong, Jiangxi and Fujian, People's Republic of China.
Hokkien, one of the national languages of Taiwan, is spoken as a regional language in the provinces of Fujian, Zhejiang and Guangdong, People’s Republic of China.
Hungarian, a Uralic language and official in Hungary, is a regional language of Romania (Northern Transylvania).
Irish, the first official language of the Republic of Ireland, is a regional language in Northern Ireland, part of the United Kingdom.
Korean, the official language of Korea, is a regional language in People's Republic of China (Yanbian Korean Autonomous Prefecture).
Malay, the official language of Malaysia, Brunei and Singapore, is a regional language in Indonesia (Riau Province).
Russian, the official language of the Russian Federation and Belarus, is a regional language of  Abkhazia, South Ossetia and other entities.
Tamil, the official language of Singapore and Sri Lanka, is a regional language in India (Tamil Nadu)
Tigrinya, an official language of Eritrea, is a regional language in Ethiopia (Tigray Region).
Turkish, the official language of Turkey and Northern Cyprus, is a regional language of Kosovo.

See also
Minority language
National language
Languages of the European Union
Languages of France
Languages of Italy
Languages of Spain
Languages of the United Kingdom
British-Irish Council

References

External links
 Regional language accessibility web tool 

Linguistic rights
Linguistic minorities
Concepts in language policy

eu:Hizkuntza gutxitu
csb:Òbéndowi jãzëk